Mamadou Coulibaly may refer to:

Mamadou Coulibaly (footballer, born 1980), Ivory Coast international football left-back
Mamadou Coulibaly (footballer, born 1985), Mali international football forward
Mamadou Coulibaly (footballer, born 1999), Senegalese football midfielder
Mamadou Coulibaly (footballer, born 2003), Ivory Coast football midfielder
Mamadou Coulibaly (judoka), Malian judoka

See also
Mamadou Koulibaly (born 1957), Ivorian politician